Out of the Tunnel is the second studio album by American art punk band MX-80 Sound. It was released on March 7, 1980, through record label Ralph.

Release 

Despite never being individually issued on CD, Out of the Tunnel can be found in its entirety paired with Crowd Control on the band's Out of Control compilation album, released in 1994.

Critical reception 

Ned Raggett of AllMusic gave the album four and a half out of five stars, writing, "Poppy but not power pop, aggro-metal without indulging in the wank fantasies prone to that style, deadpan and humorous without being a put-on, MX-80 just plain shone here, with only the slightly murky mix preventing Out of the Tunnel from achieving perfection." Another positive review came from Trouser Press, who regarded the album as the MX-80's high point and claimed that their "formula of convoluted, breakneck melodies, cross-fed musical genres and Anderson's white-hot soloing nears critical mass."

Track listing

Personnel 

 MX-80 Sound

 Bruce Anderson – guitar
 Dave Mahoney – drums
 Dale Sophiea – bass guitar
 Rich Stim – vocals, guitar, saxophone

 Additional musicians and technical

 Mark Bingham – production, mixing, recording
 Oliver Dicicco – mixing, recording
 Kim Torgerson – sleeve photography

References

External links 

 

1980 albums
Ralph Records albums
MX-80 albums